Ann Shirley Muir  (born 24 July 1946) is a New Zealand international lawn bowls player and administrator.

Bowls career
Muir won a fours bronze medal at the Asia Pacific Bowls Championships.

Muir competed at the 1994 Commonwealth Games in the women's fours, where she won the bronze medal along with her teammates Adrienne Lambert, Colleen Ferrick and Marlene Castle.

Muir won the 2013/14 pairs title and the 2005 fours title at the New Zealand National Bowls Championships when bowling for the Kensington Bowls Club.

Honours
A former president of Bowls New Zealand, and Bowls New Zealand Coach of the Year in 2016, Muir was awarded the Queen's Service Medal, for services to bowls and the community, in the 2017 Queen's Birthday Honours.

References

1946 births
Living people
Sportspeople from Auckland
New Zealand female bowls players
Bowls players at the 1994 Commonwealth Games
Commonwealth Games bronze medallists for New Zealand
Commonwealth Games medallists in lawn bowls
Recipients of the Queen's Service Medal
New Zealand sports executives and administrators
Medallists at the 1994 Commonwealth Games